Francis Greville, 1st Earl of Warwick, KT (10 October 1719 – 8 July 1773), known as Lord Brooke from 1727 to 1746 and Earl Brooke from 1746, was a British nobleman.

He inherited Warwick Castle and the title of Baron Brooke from his father in 1727. His education included time as a gentleman commoner at Winchester College (around 1731). He was created Earl Brooke, of Warwick Castle, on 7 July 1746, and became Lord Lieutenant of Warwickshire in 1749. He became a Knight of the Thistle in 1743.

In 1759, he petitioned George II for the title Earl of Warwick when the last Earl of Warwick from the Rich family died. Francis' petition was granted, and Warwick Castle was once again held by the Earls of Warwick.

He was responsible for various renovations to the castle, including the construction of the State Dining Room and the private apartments. His early dalliances with the Neo-Gothic style even caught the attention of the infamous Horace Walpole, who referred to him once as "little Brooke".  Lancelot "Capability" Brown was hired by the Earl to redesign the gardens and grounds surrounding the castle. He also employed the services of Giovanni Antonio Canal, who went on to paint five celebrated views of the castle. His son George Greville, 2nd Earl of Warwick further improved the castle and bought many of its present furnishings.

He married Elizabeth Hamilton on 15 May 1742 at Park Place, Remenham, Berkshire, daughter of Lord Archibald Hamilton and Lady Jane Hamilton, by whom he had eight children:

 Lady Louisa Augusta Greville (1743–), married William Churchill in 1770
 Lady Frances Elizabeth Greville (11 May 1744 – 6 April 1825), married Sir Henry Harpur, 6th Baronet in 1762
 Lady Charlotte Mary Greville (c.1745 – 31 May 1763), married John Stewart, 7th Earl of Galloway in 1762
 George Greville, 2nd Earl of Warwick (1746–1816)
 Lady Isabella Greville, died young
 Charles Francis Greville (1749–1809)
 Robert Fulke Greville (1751–1824)
 Lady Anne Greville (1760–1783)

See also
Earl of Warwick
List of owners of Warwick Castle

References 

|-

|-

1719 births
1773 deaths
Earls in the Peerage of Great Britain
Francis
Knights of the Thistle
Lord-Lieutenants of Warwickshire
1
People educated at Winchester College